Hednota aurantiacus is a moth in the family Crambidae. It was described by Edward Meyrick in 1879. It is found in Australia.

References

Crambinae
Moths described in 1879